Vital records are records of life events kept under governmental authority, including birth certificates, marriage licenses (or marriage certificates), separation agreements, divorce certificates or divorce party and death certificates. In some jurisdictions, vital records may also include records of civil unions or domestic partnerships.

Note that only the life events meaning is restricted to government; the records management meaning in this article applies to both government and non-government organizations.

United States
In the United States, vital records are typically maintained at both the county and state levels.  In the United Kingdom and numerous other countries vital records are recorded in the civil registry.  In the United States, vital records are public and in most cases can be viewed by anyone in person at the governmental authority.  Copies can also be requested for a fee.  There are two types of copies: certified and uncertified. Certified copies are official copies that can be used as identification whereas uncertified copies do not contain the governmental authority's seal and often are marked that they should not be used for identification. There may be additional restrictions in place on who can actually request a certified copy, such as immediate family or someone with written authorization.  Certified copies are usually much more expensive than uncertified copies.  Some states have started making vital records available online for free.  Vital records that are online typically are 90 or more years old and assume the person listed in the record is no longer alive.

Europe
Various European countries are members of an International Commission on Civil Status which provides a mutually recognized convention on the coding of entries appearing in civil status documents, with common codes and translation tables between the language of the member states. They also provide an English unofficial translation.

In the fields of records management and archival science, the term vital record is used to mean "records, regardless of medium, which are essential to the organization in order to continue with its business-crucial functions both during and after a disaster. They need not be permanent, might be active or inactive, originals or copies."

Challenges
In the past 10 years, there has been an overall increase in global birth registration rates of children under five from 58 percent to 65 percent. However, more than 100 developing countries still do not have functioning systems that can support efficient registration of births and other life events like marriages and death. Around the world, almost 230 million children under the age of five are not registered. Sub-Saharan Africa is home to 85 million of these children, while 135 million live in Asia and the Pacific. Progress with death registration has been much slower globally. In countries in most need of CRVS, up to 80 percent of deaths that occur outside health facilities and two-thirds of all deaths globally are not counted.

See also
Civil registration
 Family register
 Vital statistics (government records)

References

External links
Where to Write for Vital Records in the US - National Center for Health Statistics
New Horizons Genealogy specializes in New England and New York Colonial American Vital records, Barbour Collection, State Census records, Census Mortality Schedules, Cemetery records.
Vital Records and Records Disaster Mitigation and Recovery: An Instructional Guide published by the National Archives and Records Administration of the USA.

Identity documents
Records management